Putilovo is a rural locality (a village) in Kemskoye Rural Settlement, Nikolsky District, Vologda Oblast, Russia. The population was 86 as of 2002.

Geography 
Putilovo is located 54 km southwest of Nikolsk (the district's administrative centre) by road. Knyazhevo is the nearest rural locality.

References 

Rural localities in Nikolsky District, Vologda Oblast